Noah Christian Augustine (February 10, 1971 – November 13, 2010) was a former Chief of Metepenagiag Mi'kmaq Nation and prominent native activist in Canada, a founding member of the Native Loggers Business Association, president of the Union of New Brunswick Indians, co-chairman of the Atlantic Policy Congress of First Nations Chiefs and co-founder of the New Brunswick First Nations and Business Liaison Group.

Augustine was a grandson of Joseph Augustine and he first gained national prominence by leading the fight for aboriginal logging rights. He was a controversial figure, once charged with murder but found not guilty in the September 19, 1998 death of Bruce Barnaby, a resident of Eel Ground First Nation.

In 2004, Augustine was elected as Chief of Metepenagiag, serving until 2010 when he lost reelection to Freeman Ward. Later in 2010, Augustine died when his truck left the road, striking a tree. Royal Canadian Mounted Police investigators suggested that speed and alcohol contributed to the accident.

References

1971 births
2010 deaths
20th-century First Nations people
21st-century First Nations people
Accidental deaths in New Brunswick
Indigenous leaders in Atlantic Canada
Mi'kmaq people
People from Northumberland County, New Brunswick
Road incident deaths in Canada